The fanega or Spanish bushel was an old measure of dry capacity in Spanish-speaking countries.  It was generally used in an agricultural context to measure quantities of grain.  The measure varied greatly, but in Castile, it was equivalent to roughly 55.5 liters.  It was also a measure of surface area that was further subdivided into 100 varas, or the amount of land that could be sown with a fanega of seed.

See also
 Bushel

External links

Units of volume
Obsolete units of measurement